Manaj is an Albanian surname. Notable people with the surname include:

Ali Manaj (born 1937), Albanian politician
Arb Manaj (born 1998), Kosovan footballer
Rey Manaj (born 1997), Albanian footballer

See also
Maraj

Albanian-language surnames